Nature is a wildlife television series produced by Thirteen/WNET New York.  It has been distributed to United States public television stations by the PBS television service since its debut on October 10, 1982. Some episodes may appear in syndication on many PBS member stations around the United States and Canada, and on the Discovery Channel. , the series airs on Wednesdays on PBS.



Episodes

Season One: 1982–1983

Season Two: 1983–1984

Season Three: 1984–1985

Season Four: 1985–1986

Season Five: 1986–1987

Season Six: 1987–1988

Season Seven: 1988–1989

Season Eight: 1989–1990

Season Nine: 1990–1991

Season Ten: 1991–1992

Season Eleven: 1992–1993

Season Twelve: 1993–1994

Season Thirteen: 1994–1995

Season Fourteen: 1995–1996

Season Fifteen: 1996–1997

Season Sixteen: 1997–1998

Season Seventeen: 1998–1999

Season Eighteen: 1999–2000

Season Nineteen: 2000–2001

Season Twenty: 2001–2002

Season Twenty-One: 2002–2003

Season Twenty-Two: 2003–2004

Season Twenty-Three: 2004–2005

Season Twenty-Four: 2005–2006

Season Twenty-Five: 2006–2007

Season Twenty-Six: 2007–2008

Season Twenty-Seven: 2008–2009

Season Twenty-Eight: 2009–2010

Season Twenty-Nine: 2010–2011

Season Thirty: 2011–2012

Season Thirty-One: 2012–2013

Season Thirty-Two: 2013–2014

Season Thirty-Three: 2014–2015

Season Thirty-Four: 2015–2016

Season Thirty-Five: 2016–2017

Season Thirty-Six: 2017–2018

Season Thirty-Seven: 2018–2019

Season Thirty-Eight: 2019-2020

Season Thirty-Nine: 2020-2021

Season Forty: 2021-2022

Season Forty-One: 2022-2023

References 

Lists of American non-fiction television series episodes